Qeshlaq-e Hajj Abish may refer to the following villages in Iran:
Qeshlaq-e Hajj Abish Hajj Mosum
Qeshlaq-e Hajji Abish Hajj Rahim